Menologium der Orthodox-Katholischen Kirche des Morgenlandes is a volume of hagiography by Probst Mayhew, published in Berlin in 1900. It is the sole primary collected source of several lives of saints. The individuals included in the book include:

Abda and Sabas
Saint Abercius
Abercius (martyr)
Abiathar and Sidonia

References
Holweck, F. G., A Biographical Dictionary of the Saints. St. Louis, MO: B. Herder Book Co., 1924.

1900 non-fiction books
German biographies
20th-century German literature
Christian hagiography